Joanna Niełacna (born 16 October 1973) is a Polish sprinter. She competed in the women's 4 × 100 metres relay at the 2000 Summer Olympics.

References

1973 births
Living people
Athletes (track and field) at the 2000 Summer Olympics
Polish female sprinters
Olympic athletes of Poland
Place of birth missing (living people)
Olympic female sprinters